Protein Niban is a protein that in humans is encoded by the FAM129A gene. Paralogs of this protein include FAM129B, and FAM129C.

References

Further reading